The Arellano University Chiefs is the athletic team of Arellano University. It is a member of the National Collegiate Athletic Association (NCAA) and the National Capital Region Athletic Association (NCRAA). The team has several intercollegiate varsity sports teams for women and men at Arellano.

History

Originally as the Arellano Flaming Arrows, the team won the National Student's Championship (NSC) in the 1970s. Years later, the Chiefs entered the best-of-three finals in the men's basketball division of the NCRAA in 2006 when they were defeated by the Saint Francis of Assisi College Doves. In a repeat finals appearance in 2007, head coach Leo Isaac finally led the Chiefs to the championship with a 67–64 game three win against the EAC Generals. The Chiefs relied on their defense to stop EAC's Ronjay Buenafe, while supporters of the rival teams had to be restrained inside the Rizal Memorial Coliseum. The then Baby Chiefs also defeated the Olivarez College juniors team in their own title series to ensure both NCRAA basketball titles would go to their Juan Sumulong Campus.

In 2008, the Chiefs reigned anew against 2006 tormentor St. Francis in two games., while the Baby Chiefs also swept the Dovelets in juniors' competition to keep both basketball trophies. The Chiefs' NCRAA championship caused their qualification to the 2008 Philippine Collegiate Championship for basketball. In the PCC, they defeated UCN Golden Dragons in the first round, but they were eliminated in the quarterfinals by three-peat NCAA champions San Beda Red Lions.

The Chiefs were able to qualify anew for the 2009 NCRAA finals, but they were defeated by upstarts Universal College Golden Dragons in overtime to deny the Chiefs of a third consecutive championship, while the Baby Chiefs were luckier as they defeated the Rizal Technological University Baby Thunders to clinch their third consecutive championship.

The Chiefs are also the reigning three-time Fr. Martin Cup champions, their last championship coming in 2009 against Philippine Merchant Marine School.

With the departure of Philippine Christian University (PCU) Dolphins after exposure of several juniors' players enrolling with forged documents, the NCAA originally opened its doors for new members, and Arellano was one of the schools that lodged their application. Arellano was named as one of the frontrunners, but the NCAA Policy Board fail to garner enough number of votes to admit a new member which closed the doors for new members for their 2009–10 season.

However, the NCAA invited "guest teams" instead, and Arellano, along with the AUF Great Danes and fellow NCRAA member EAC Generals were accepted as guest teams for the 2009–10 season, where they are also eligible to win championships.

The Chiefs finished their 2009 campaigned fifth, the best among the guest teams, with an 8–10 record. At the end of the tournament, Giorgio Ciriacruz was named as part of the Mythical Five (all-NCAA team), the only player from a guest team to be named in the five-member roster.

On the NCAA Season 86, Arellano has upgraded from its guest to probationary status. While on the Season 87 of NCAA, Isiah Ciriacruz won't play for the season due to a sustained injury and Adrian Celada was named as Team Captain. And the school grab its regular membership on the league during the 89th Season.

Basketball

Notable players 

James Forrester (skipped final three years of eligibility to play professionally)
John Pinto
Jio Jalalon (skipped final two years of eligibility to play professionally)
Keith Agovida
Gio Ciriacruz
Isiah Ciriacruz
Leonard "Bimbot" Anquilo
Orlando Daroya
Lee Boliver
Allen Virtudazo 
Alfie Martinez
Tylon Darjuan
Jordan Melaño
Gerald Espinosa

Volleyball 

The volleyball team of the team are already a powerhouse once it joined it 2009. Currently, the women's volleyball has 2 straight finals 
appearances (Season 89, and 90) which, in the 90th season, they became the champion. And 1 finals appearance in the men's tournament (Season 86). They are now listed as one of the greatest teams in Philippine Collegiate Volleyball.

Women's volleyball roster
NCAA Season 95

Head coach: Roberto "Obet" Javier
Assistant coach: Richard Estacio

NCAA Season 91

Head coach: Roberto "Obet" Javier

Men's volleyball roster
NCAA Season 93

Head coach: Sherwin Meneses
Assistant coach: Bryan Vitug

 
Head coach: Sherwin Meneses

Juniors' volleyball roster

Head coach: Sherwin Meneses

Beach volleyball
NCAA Season 93
Women's
 Princess O. Bello
 Sarah Princess T. Verutiao
 Glydel Anne Liu

Men's
 Christian B. Dela Paz
 Demy Freedom M. Lapuz
 Joshua C. Esguerra

Juniors
 Jesus Valdez
 Adrian Villados
 Zachary Dablo (reserve)

Notable players
 Women's Division
 NCAA Season 93 champions

Jovielyn Prado, Mary Anne Esguerra (c), Princess Bello, Meredith Balanova, Rhea Ramirez, Sarah Verutiao, Faye Flores, Glydel Liu, Cherry Buemia, Necole Ebuen, Regine Arocha, Andrea Marzan, Carla Donato, Eunika Torres, Head coach: Roberto "Obet" Javier

 NCAA Season 92 champions

Jovielyn Prado (c), Mary Anne Esguerra, Princess Bello, Meredith Balanova, Rhea Ramirez, Sarah Verutiao, Faye Flores, Glydel Liu, Cherry Buemia, Regine Arocha, Andrea Marzan, Carla Donato, Eunika Torres, Head coach: Roberto "Obet" Javier

 NCAA Season 90 champions
 Jovielyn Grace Prado
- NCAA Season 92 2nd Best Outside Spiker and Finals' MVP
- NCAA Season 93 1st Best Outside Spiker
 Rhea Marist Ramirez
- NCAA Season 91 Best Setter
- 2017 PVL Collegiate Conference Best Setter
 Regine Anne Arocha
- NCAA Season 93 Best Opposite Spiker and Finals' MVP
- 2017 PVL Collegiate Conference 2nd Best Outside Spiker
 Necole Ebuen
- NCAA Season 93 Rookie of the Year
 Christine Joy Rosario
- NCAA Season 91 Best Spiker
 Diane Ticar
 Angelica Legacion
 Elaine Sagun
 Danna Henson
 Shirley Salamagos
 Menchie Tubiera

 Men's Division
 John Joseph Cabillan
- NCAA Season 92 2nd Best Outside Spiker
 Kevin Liberato
- NCAA Season 92 1st Best Middle Blocker
- NCAA Season 93 1st Best Middle Blocker
 Christian Dela Paz
- NCAA Season 93 2nd Best Outside Spiker
 Carlo Lozada

 Juniors' Division
 NCAA Season 93 beach volleyball champions
- Adrian Villados Jesus Valdez Zachary Dablo
 Adrian Villados
- NCAA Season 93 beach volleyball MVP
 Gideon James Guadalupe
- NCAA Season 93 2nd Best Middle Blocker

Chess
The chess team of Arellano University has bagged two straight championships, being one of the top contenders in the area of this sport.

Head Coach: Rudy Ibañez

Taekwondo

Head Coach: Carlos Padilla

References

Arellano University
National Collegiate Athletic Association (Philippines) teams
College sports teams in Metro Manila
Spikers' Turf